Leon Edward Panetta (born June 28, 1938) is an American Democratic Party politician who has served in several different public office positions, including Secretary of Defense, CIA Director, White House Chief of Staff, Director of the Office of Management and Budget, and as a U.S. Representative from  California.

Panetta was a member of the United States House of Representatives from 1977 to 1993. He served under President Bill Clinton as Director of the Office of Management and Budget from 1993 to 1994 and as White House Chief of Staff from 1994 to 1997. He co-founded the Panetta Institute for Public Policy in 1997 and served as a Distinguished Scholar to Chancellor Charles B. Reed of the California State University System and as a professor of public policy at Santa Clara University.

In January 2009, newly elected President Barack Obama nominated Panetta for the post of Director of the Central Intelligence Agency. Panetta was confirmed by the Senate in February 2009. As director of the CIA, Panetta oversaw the operation that brought down Osama bin Laden. On April 28, 2011, Obama announced the nomination of Panetta as Defense Secretary, to replace the retiring Robert Gates. In June the Senate confirmed Panetta unanimously and he assumed the office on July 1, 2011. David Petraeus took over as CIA Director on September 6, 2011.

Since retiring as Secretary of Defense in 2013, Panetta has served as chairman of The Panetta Institute for Public Policy, located at California State University, Monterey Bay, a campus of the California State University that he helped establish during his tenure as congressman. The institute is dedicated to motivating and preparing people for lives of public service and helping them to become more knowledgeably engaged in the democratic process. He also serves on a number of boards and commissions and frequently writes and lectures on public policy issues.

Early life, education, and military service
Panetta was born in Monterey, California, the son of Carmelina Maria (Prochilo) and Carmelo Frank Panetta, Italian immigrants from Siderno in Calabria, Italy. In the 1940s, the Panetta family owned a restaurant in Monterey.

He was raised in the Monterey area, and attended two Catholic grammar schools: San Carlos School (Monterey) and Junípero Serra School (Carmel). He attended Monterey High School, a public school where he became involved in student politics, and was a member of the Junior Statesmen of America. As a junior, he was the vice president of the Student Body, and as a senior, he became its president. In 1956, he entered Santa Clara University, California, and graduated magna cum laude in 1960 with a Bachelor of Arts in Political Science. In 1963, he received a Juris Doctor from the Santa Clara University School of Law.

In 1964, he joined the United States Army as a Second Lieutenant, where he served as an officer in Army Military Intelligence, and received the Army Commendation Medal. In 1966, he was discharged as a First Lieutenant.

Political career

Early political career
Panetta started in politics in 1966 as a legislative assistant to Republican Senator Thomas Kuchel, the United States Senate Minority Whip from California, whom Panetta has called "a tremendous role model".

In 1969 he became the assistant to Robert H. Finch, Secretary of the United States Department of Health, Education, and Welfare under the Nixon administration. Soon thereafter he was appointed Director of the Office for Civil Rights.

Panetta chose to enforce civil rights and equal education laws over the objection of President Nixon, who wanted enforcement to move slowly in keeping with his strategy to gain political support among Southern whites. Robert Finch and Assistant Secretary John Veneman supported Panetta and refused to fire him, threatening to resign if forced to do so. Eventually forced out of office in 1970, Panetta left Washington to work as Executive Assistant for John Lindsay, the then-Republican Mayor of New York City (Lindsay would switch parties the following year.) Panetta wrote about his Nixon administration experience in his 1971 book Bring Us Together.

He moved back to Monterey to practice law at Panetta, Thompson & Panetta from 1971 to 1976.

U.S. House of Representatives

Elections

Like Lindsay, Panetta switched to the Democratic Party in 1971, citing his belief that the Republican Party was moving away from the political center. In 1976, Panetta was elected to the U.S. Congress to represent California's then-16th congressional district, unseating incumbent Republican Burt Talcott with 53% of the vote. He would never face another contest nearly that close, and was reelected eight times. (With a few boundary adjustments, the 16th district became the 17th district after the 1990 census and is the 20th district today. It consists of all of Monterey and San Benito Counties, plus most of Santa Cruz County, including the city of Santa Cruz. At the time of Panetta's first election, it also included the northern part of San Luis Obispo County.)

Tenure
During his time in Congress, Panetta concentrated mostly on budget issues, civil rights, education, healthcare, agriculture, immigration, and environmental protection, particularly preventing oil drilling off the California coast. He wrote the Hunger Prevention Act (Public Law 100–435) of 1988 and the Fair Employment Practices Resolution. He was the author of legislation establishing the Monterey Bay National Marine Sanctuary, and legislation providing Medicare coverage for hospice care. Working with Chancellor Barry Munitz of CSU, he helped establish CSU Monterey Bay at the former Fort Ord military base.

He also attempted to form the Big Sur National Scenic Area with  Senator Alan Cranston. The bill would have created a  scenic area administered by the U.S. Forest Service.

The bill was opposed by California Senator S. I. Hayakawa, development interests, and Big Sur residents. Local residents mocked the plan as 'Panetta's Pave 'n' Save,' and raised a fund of more than $100,000 to lobby against the proposal. The legislation was blocked by Hayakawa in the Energy Committee and did not reach a vote.

Budget Committee
A member of the House Committee on the Budget from 1979 to 1989, and its chairman from 1989 to 1993, Panetta played a key role in the 1990 Budget Summit.

Committee assignments
His positions included:
 Chairman of the U.S. House Committee on the Budget
 Chairman of the Agriculture Committee's Subcommittee on Domestic Marketing, Consumer Relations, and Nutrition
 Chairman of the Administration Committee's Subcommittee on Personnel and Police
 Chairman of the Task Force on Domestic Hunger created by the U.S. House Select Committee on Hunger
 Vice Chairman of the Caucus of Vietnam-Era Veterans in Congress
 Member of the President's Commission on Foreign Language and International Studies.

Director of the Office of Management and Budget
Though elected to a ninth term in 1992, Panetta left the House at the beginning of 1993, after President-elect Bill Clinton selected him to serve as Director of the United States Office of Management and Budget. In that role he developed the budget package that would eventually result in the balanced budget of 1998.

White House Chief of Staff

In 1994, President Clinton became increasingly concerned about a lack of order and focus in the White House, an issue that stretched from foreign to domestic policy and political matters. President Clinton, who had vowed to run a professional operation, asked Panetta to become his new chief of staff, replacing Mack McLarty. According to author Nigel Hamilton, "Panetta replaced McLarty for the rest of Clinton's first term—and the rest is history. To be a great leader, a modern president must have a great chief of staff—and in Leon Panetta, Clinton got the enforcer he deserved." Panetta was appointed White House Chief of Staff on July 17, 1994, and he held that position until January 20, 1997. He was a key negotiator of the 1996 budget, which was another important step toward bringing the budget into balance.

Director of the CIA

Nomination

On January 5, 2009, President-elect Barack Obama announced his intention to nominate Panetta to the post of Director of the Central Intelligence Agency.

At the time of his selection, journalists and politicians raised concerns about Panetta's limited experience in intelligence, aside from his two-year service as a military intelligence officer in the 1960s. California Democratic Senator Dianne Feinstein, the Chairman of the Senate Select Committee on Intelligence, expressed concerns that she was not consulted about the Panetta appointment and stated her belief that "the Agency is best-served by having an intelligence professional in charge at this time."

Former CIA officer Ishmael Jones stated that Panetta was a wise choice, because of his close personal connection to the President and lack of exposure to the CIA bureaucracy. Also, Washington Post columnist David Ignatius said that Panetta did have exposure to intelligence operations as Director of the OMB and as Chief of Staff for President Bill Clinton, where he "sat in on the daily intelligence briefings as chief of staff, and he reviewed the nation's most secret intelligence-collection and covert-action programs in his previous post as director of the Office of Management and Budget".

On February 12, 2009, Panetta was confirmed in the full Senate by voice vote.

Tenure

On February 19, 2009, Panetta was sworn in as Director of the Central Intelligence Agency by Vice President Joe Biden before an audience of CIA employees. Panetta reportedly received a "rock star welcome" from his new subordinates.

As CIA Director, Panetta traveled extensively to intelligence outposts around the world and worked with international leaders to confront threats of Islamic extremism and Taliban. In 2010, working with the Senate Intelligence Committee, he conducted a secret review of the use of torture by the CIA (euphemistically referred to as "enhanced interrogation techniques") during the administration of George W. Bush. The review, which came to be known by 2014 as the "Panetta Review," yielded a series of memoranda that, according to The New York Times, "cast a particularly harsh light" on the Bush-era interrogation program. The Times notes "The effort to write the exhaustive history of the C.I.A.’s detention operations was fraught from the beginning. President Obama officially ended the program during his first week in office in 2009. The intelligence committee announced its intention to take a hard look at the program, but there was little appetite inside the [Obama] White House to accede to the committee’s request for all classified C.I.A. cables related to it." The findings of the Panetta Review reportedly aligned with much of what the Senate Intelligence Committee report on CIA torture found in its factual accounting. Both reports were largely seen as an effort in fact-finding and prevention, but not a governmental path towards some possible project of accountability or punishment for past interrogation or torture.

Panetta supported the Obama administration's campaign of U.S. drone strikes in Pakistan, which he identified as the "most effective weapon" against senior al-Qaeda leadership. Drone strikes increased significantly under Panetta, with as many as 50 suspected al-Qaeda militants being killed in May 2009 alone.

As Director of the CIA, Panetta oversaw the hunt for terrorist leader Osama bin Laden, and played a key role in the operation in which bin Laden was killed on May 1, 2011.

Under Panetta, the CIA advanced workplace rights and benefits for LGBT employees; the agency, for the first time, implemented policies extending benefits to same-sex partners of employees.

Secretary of Defense (2011–2013)

Nomination

On April 28, 2011, President Obama announced the nomination of Panetta as United States Secretary of Defense as a replacement for retiring Secretary Robert Gates. On June 21, 2011, the Senate confirmed Panetta in an unusual 100–0 vote. He was sworn in on July 1, 2011.

Tenure
One of Panetta's first major acts as Defense Secretary was to jointly certify with the Chairman of the Joint Chiefs of Staff that the military was prepared to repeal "Don't Ask, Don't Tell", which triggered final repeal after 60 days.

In August 2011, Panetta publicly warned that deeper cuts in the defense budget risked hollowing out the military and would hamper Pentagon efforts to deal with rising powers such as China, North Korea, and Iran and he urged Congress not to go beyond the roughly $500 billion in defense cuts required over the next decade under the debt reduction bill signed by President Barack Obama. Working with military and civilian leaders at the Department of Defense, Panetta developed a new defense strategy for the 21st century.

Funding the United States military, in the face of tightening budget constraints, became an ongoing theme of Panetta's tenure. He also warned that future service members may see changes in retirement benefits, and that the military healthcare system may need reforms, to rein in costs, while also ensuring quality care.

Another major issue during Panetta's tenure as Defense Secretary was the Obama administration's diplomatic effort to dissuade Iran from developing nuclear weapons. In January 2012, Panetta stated that nuclear weapons development was a "red line" that Iran would not be allowed to cross—and that the United States was keeping all options, including military ones, open to completely prevent it. He said that Iran would not be allowed to block the Straits of Hormuz.

In January 2013, shortly before his departure from the Defense Secretary post, Panetta announced that women would be allowed to enter all combat jobs in the military, citing an assessment phase in which "each branch of service will examine all its jobs and units not currently integrated and then produce a timetable for integrating them".

Activities outside politics 

Panetta and his wife Sylvia founded the Panetta Institute for Public Policy in December 1997 and served as co-directors there until 2009, when Panetta was appointed CIA director by President Obama. He has since returned to the institute in the role of chairman, while his wife serves as co-chair and CEO, supervising the institute's day-to-day operations. The institute is located at California State University, Monterey Bay, a campus Panetta was instrumental in creating on the site of the decommissioned Fort Ord Army base when he was a Congressman. Coincidentally, Panetta was stationed at Fort Ord in the 1960s during his service as an Army intelligence officer.

Panetta served on the board of the UC Santa Cruz Foundation, as a Distinguished Scholar to the Chancellor of California State University and as a Presidential Professor at Santa Clara University. He was urged to consider running for Governor of California during the recall election in 2003 but declined in part because of the short time available to raise the necessary campaign funds.

Panetta has long been an advocate for the world's oceans. In addition to introducing legislation and winning passage of ocean protections measures such as the Monterey Bay National Marine Sanctuary during his time in Congress, he was named chairman in 2003 of the Pew Oceans Commission, which in 2005 combined with the U.S. Commission on Ocean Policy to establish the Joint Ocean Commission Initiative. Panetta now co-chairs the Joint Ocean Commission Initiative with Admiral James D. Watkins, U.S. Navy (Ret.) and continues to serve as a Commission member. Panetta also serves as an advocate and information source for other ocean organizations, including the National Marine Sanctuary Foundation and the Monterey Bay Aquarium.

In 2006, Panetta was part of the presidentially-appointed Iraq Study Group, or Baker Commission, which studied potential changes in U.S. policy in Iraq.

In 2014, Panetta published his memoir Worthy Fights, in which he recounted his long career in public service. While overwhelmingly positive in his assessment of the Obama presidency, Panetta aired some disagreements in the book with the President's policies in Syria and Iraq. Panetta said: "By failing to persuade Iraq's leader to allow a continuing force of US troops, the commander in chief "created a vacuum . . . and it's out of that vacuum that ISIS began to breed."

He regularly obtains fees for speaking engagements, including from the Carlyle Group. He is also a supporter of Booz Allen Hamilton.

After Secretary of Defense (2013–present) 

Panetta was a speaker on Day 3 of the 2016 Democratic National Convention in which Hillary Clinton was nominated to run as the Democratic candidate in the presidential election that year. Notably, his speech was booed by anti-war supporters of Bernie Sanders who protested his war record.

Panetta told CBS News that Congress releasing the Nunes Memo, which purported to provide intelligence about the open Russia probe, could cause damage to national security.

Panetta serves as an advisor to the COVID-19 Technology Task Force, a technology industry coalition founded in March 2020 collaborating on solutions to respond to and recover from the COVID-19 pandemic.

Panetta compared the Fall of Kabul to the Taliban in August 2021 to the failed Bay of Pigs Invasion of Cuba in 1961, saying that "President Kennedy took responsibility for what took place. I strongly recommend to President Biden that he take responsibility ... admit the mistakes that were made."

In October 2020, Panetta signed a letter stating the Hunter Biden laptop controversy “has the classic earmarks of a Russian information operation. Panetta joined 50 other former intelligence officials in signing the letter, which stated that the laptop abandoned by Hunter Biden contained "all the classic earmarks of a Russian disinformation operation," because it contained potentially damaging information to the Biden campaign. However, in 2022, several media outlets, including the New York Times and Washington Post, have confirmed the laptop's authenticity.

Panetta, one of all 10 living former secretaries of defense, published a Washington Post op-ed piece in January 2021 telling President Trump not to involve the military in determining the outcome of the 2020 elections.

In October 2022, Panetta joined the Council for Responsible Social Media project launched by Issue One to address the negative mental, civic, and public health impacts of social media in the United States co-chaired by former House Democratic Caucus Leader Dick Gephardt and former Massachusetts Lieutenant Governor Kerry Healey.

Responsibilities
Panetta has held positions within a number of institutions and corporations, including:
 Joint Ocean Commission Initiative, Commissioner and Co-Chair
 Pew Oceans Commission, Commissioner and Chairman
 Committee for a Responsible Federal Budget, Co-Chair
 Bread for the World, Board of Directors
 National Marine Sanctuary Foundation, Board of Directors
 National Leadership Roundtable on Church Management, Board of Directors (2004–2009)
 New York Stock Exchange,
 Co-chairman of the Corporate Accountability and Listing Standards Committee
 Board of Directors (1997–present)
 Close Up Foundation, Board of Directors (1999–present)
 Connetics Investor Relations, Board of Directors (2000–present)
 Fleishman-Hillard,
 Co-chairman of the Corporate Accountability and Listing Standards Committee
 Co-chairman of the Corporate Credibility Advisory practice
 Member of the International Advisory Board
 Junior Statesmen Foundation Inc., Trustee (2004)
 Public Policy Institute of California, Board of Directors
 Blue Shield of California, Board of Directors (2013–present)
 Oracle Corporation, Board of Directors (2015–present)
Center for Tech Diplomacy at Purdue, Global Advisory Board (2021–present)
In June 2002, the U.S. Conference of Catholic Bishops appointed Panetta to their National Review Board, which was created to look into the Catholic Church's sexual abuse scandal. This created controversy because of Panetta's pro-choice stance on abortion and other views seen as conflicting with those of the Church.
 Beacon Global Strategies, Senior Counselor (May 2014 – Present) Defense Contractor 

Panetta is also a member of the Partnership for a Secure America's bipartisan Advisory Board. The Partnership is a non-profit organization based in Washington, DC that promotes bipartisan solutions to national security and foreign policy issues.

Panetta serves on the Advisory Board of the Committee to Investigate Russia.

Personal life
Panetta is married to Sylvia Marie Varni, who administered his home district offices during his terms in Congress. They live on his family's  walnut farm in the Carmel Valley, California. They have three sons and six grandchildren.

Awards
 1966: Army Commendation Medal
 1969: Abraham Lincoln Award, National Education Association
 1983: Foreign Language Advocate Award, Northeast Conference on the Teaching of Foreign Languages.
 1983: Ralph B. Atkinson Award for Civil Liberties, Monterey County Chapter of the ACLU
 1984: A. Philip Randolph Award
 1988: Golden Plow Award, American Farm Bureau Federation
 1991: President's Award, American Council on the Teaching of Foreign Languages
 1991: Coastal and Ocean Management Award, Coastal Zone Foundation
 1993: Peter Burnett Award for Distinguished Public Service
 1995: Distinguished Public Service Medal, Center for the Study of the Presidency
 1997: Special Achievement Award for Public Service, National Italian American Foundation
 2001: John H. Chafee Coastal Stewardship Award, Coastal America
 2002: Law Alumni Special Achievement Award, Santa Clara University School of Law Alumni Association
 2003: Julius A. Stratton "Champion of the Coast" Award for Coastal Leadership
 2005: Received an honorary Doctorate from University of Wisconsin–Parkside
 2005: Received an honorary Doctorate of Public Service from Northeastern University
 2006: Paul Peck Award
 2012: Intrepid Freedom Award, Intrepid Sea, Air & Space Museum
 2012: Golden Plate Award, American Academy of Achievement
 2014: Excellence in Policy, Peter Benchley Ocean Awards
 2015: Dwight D. Eisenhower Award, National Defense Industrial Association
 2018: Sylvanus Thayer Award from the United States Military Academy
 2019:  Grand Cordon of the Order of the Rising Sun

Books

References

Further reading
 Clinton, Bill (2005). My Life. Vintage. .

External links

Department of Defense biography
 
 
 Biography of Panetta, Hartnell University
 Profile at SourceWatch
 
 The Panetta Institute for Public Policy
 

|-

|-

|-

|-

|-

|-

|-

1938 births
21st-century American politicians
21st-century American memoirists
American writers of Italian descent
American people of Italian descent
Atlantic Council
California lawyers
California Republicans
Directors of the Central Intelligence Agency
Directors of the Office of Management and Budget
Living people
Members of the United States House of Representatives from California
Obama administration cabinet members
Obama administration personnel
People from Carmel Valley, California
People from Monterey, California
Santa Clara University School of Law alumni
United States Army officers
United States Secretaries of Defense
White House Chiefs of Staff
Writers from California
Catholics from California
Grand Cordons of the Order of the Rising Sun
Clinton administration cabinet members
Democratic Party members of the United States House of Representatives from California
Members of Congress who became lobbyists